The Hate Crime Statistics Act, 28 U.S.C. § 534 (HCSA), passed in 1990 and modified in 2009 by the Matthew Shepard and James Byrd, Jr. Hate Crimes Prevention Act, requires the Attorney General to collect data on crimes committed because of the victim's race, religion, disability, sexual orientation, or ethnicity.  The bill was signed into law by George H. W. Bush, and was the first federal statute to "recognize and name gay, lesbian and bisexual people." Since 1992, the Department of Justice through one of its agencies, the FBI, has jointly published an annual report on hate crime statistics.

On November 16, 2020, the FBI released its 2019 Hate Crime Statistics Act (HCSA) report with the total number of reported hate crime incidents rising 2.7% to 7,317 (2019) from  7,120 (2018).

References 

1990 in law
United States federal criminal legislation
 
1990 in LGBT history